Butler is a borough in Morris County, New Jersey, United States. As of the 2020 United States census, the borough's population was 8,047, an increase of 508 (+6.7%) from the 2010 census count of 7,539, which in turn reflected an increase of 119 (+1.6%) from the 7,420 counted in the 2000 census.

Butler was incorporated as a borough by an act of the New Jersey Legislature on March 13, 1901, from portions of Pequannock Township.

History
The area now known as Butler was originally called "West Bloomingdale" and was sparsely populated. Water power brought manufacturing entities to the area. In 1857, The Pequannock Valley Paper Company moved from Bergen County and in 1868 the Newbrough Hard Rubber Company built a factory, both based along the Pequannock River. These were two significant economic entities that contributed to the growth of the Borough. In 1871, the New Jersey Midland Railroad extended track through Butler from Paterson, making an important transportation connection for both passengers and freight.  The northern terminus for the New York, Susquehanna and Western Railway's passenger service was located at Butler until 1966.  The railroad still carries freight through Butler.

The growing community was given the name "Butler" in 1881 after Richard Butler, who had taken ownership of the Hard Rubber Company. A Post Office was established and a larger railroad station was built. This station has been the Borough Museum since 1977. The Hard Rubber Company eventually merged with other businesses and became the American Hard Rubber Company in 1898. A "Soft" Rubber Company built a factory just along Main Street. The borough continued to grow as other factories and supporting businesses were established. The population in 1920 was 2,265 people. By 1950, it was 4,063.

Butler's largest fire began just after midnight, February 26, 1957, when one of the nation's largest rubber reclaiming mills (Pequanoc Rubber Company on Main Street) was destroyed by a blaze estimated to have caused a loss of as much as $3 million (equivalent to $ million in ). The mill occupied the site on upper Main Street, an irregular shaped complex 600 feet by 300 feet and three to four stories high; it produced over 100 tons of reusable sheet rubber daily from 200 tons of scrap. One Butler Heights resident remembers the fire being so bright she could read a newspaper in her yard at 3 am at a distance of a mile. The glow reportedly was visible for 100 miles, mutual aid response was required by volunteer fire companies from a dozen nearby fire companies.

Numerous organizations exist in town and, along with the neighboring towns of Kinnelon and Bloomingdale, many "Tri-Boro" organizations serve the area, including the local Little League & Volunteer First Aid Squad.

Butler was the location of a health resort run by Benedict Lust called "Yungborn" that opened on September 15, 1896.

Geography
According to the United States Census Bureau, the borough had a total area of 2.06 square miles (5.34 km2), including 2.03 square miles (5.27 km2) of land and 0.03 square miles (0.07 km2) of water (1.31%).

The borough borders the municipalities of Kinnelon and Riverdale in Morris County; and both Bloomingdale and West Milford in Passaic County.

Demographics

2010 census

The Census Bureau's 2006–2010 American Community Survey showed that (in 2010 inflation-adjusted dollars) median household income was $78,614 (with a margin of error of +/− $5,375) and the median family income was $102,435 (+/− $7,072). Males had a median income of $69,407 (+/− $4,399) versus $46,286 (+/− $4,815) for females. The per capita income for the borough was $36,678 (+/− $3,263). About 3.2% of families and 3.4% of the population were below the poverty line, including 4.6% of those under age 18 and 1.3% of those age 65 or over.

2000 census
As of the 2000 United States census there were 7,420 people, 2,868 households, and 2,024 families residing in the borough. The population density was 3,568.9 people per square mile (1,377.3/km2). There were 2,923 housing units at an average density of 1,405.9 per square mile (542.6/km2). The racial makeup of the borough was 94.89% White, 0.62% African American, 0.20% Native American, 1.85% Asian, 0.01% Pacific Islander, 1.48% from other races, and 0.94% from two or more races. Hispanic or Latino of any race were 5.11% of the population.

There were 2,868 households, out of which 30.6% had children under the age of 18 living with them, 57.8% were married couples living together, 9.4% had a female householder with no husband present, and 29.4% were non-families. 24.1% of all households were made up of individuals, and 9.4% had someone living alone who was 65 years of age or older. The average household size was 2.58 and the average family size was 3.09.

In the borough the population was spread out, with 21.7% under the age of 18, 7.2% from 18 to 24, 33.8% from 25 to 44, 24.2% from 45 to 64, and 13.2% who were 65 years of age or older. The median age was 38 years. For every 100 females, there were 97.1 males. For every 100 females age 18 and over, there were 94.7 males.

The median income for a household in the borough was $57,455, and the median income for a family was $66,199.  Males had a median income of $45,975 versus $35,815 for females. The per capita income for the borough was $27,113. About 2.5% of families and 5.0% of the population were below the poverty line, including 4.2% of those under age 18 and 8.4% of those age 65 or over.

Government

Local government
Butler is governed under the Borough form of New Jersey municipal government, which is used in 218 municipalities (of the 564) statewide, making it the most common form of government in New Jersey. The governing body is comprised of the Mayor and the Borough Council, with all positions elected at-large on a partisan basis as part of the November general election. The Mayor is elected directly by the voters to a four-year term of office. The Borough Council is comprised of six members elected to serve three-year terms on a staggered basis, with two seats coming up for election each year in a three-year cycle. The Borough form of government used by Butler is a "weak mayor / strong council" government in which council members act as the legislative body with the mayor presiding at meetings and voting only in the event of a tie. The mayor can veto ordinances subject to an override by a two-thirds majority vote of the council. The mayor makes committee and liaison assignments for council members, and most appointments are made by the mayor with the advice and consent of the council.

, the Mayor of Butler is Republican Ryan Martinez (R, 2026). Members of the Borough Council are Council President Raymond Verdonik (R, 2023), Alexander Calvi (R, 2024), Robert Fox (R, 2024), Robert H. Meier (R, 2024), Britni Morley (R, 2025), and Marc Piccirillo (R, 2023; elected to serve an unexpired term).

Federal, state and county representation
Butler is located in the 11th Congressional District and is part of New Jersey's 26th state legislative district.

 

Morris County is governed by a Board of County Commissioners comprised of seven members who are elected at-large in partisan elections to three-year terms on a staggered basis, with either one or three seats up for election each year as part of the November general election. Actual day-to-day operation of departments is supervised by County Administrator, Deena Leary. , Morris County's Commissioners are
Commissioner Director John Krickus (R, Chatham Township, term as commissioner ends December 31, 2024; term as director ends 2023), Commissioner Deputy Director Christine Myers (R, Harding, term as commissioner ends 2025; term as deputy director ends 2023), Douglas Cabana (R, Boonton Township, 2025), Thomas J. Mastrangelo (R, Montville, 2025), Stephen H. Shaw (R, Mountain Lakes, 2024), Deborah Smith (R, Denville, 2024) and Tayfun Selen (R, Chatham Township, 2023) The county's constitutional officers are the County Clerk and County Surrogate (both elected for five-year terms of office) and the County Sheriff (elected for a three-year term). , they are County Clerk Ann F. Grossi (R, Parsippany–Troy Hills, 2023), Sheriff James M. Gannon (R, Boonton Township, 2022) and Surrogate Heather Darling (R, Roxbury, 2024).

Politics
As of March 2011, there were a total of 4,551 registered voters in Butler, of which 863 (19.0%) were registered as Democrats, 1,458 (32.0%) were registered as Republicans and 2,224 (48.9%) were registered as Unaffiliated. There were 6 voters registered as Libertarians or Greens.

In the 2012 presidential election, Republican Mitt Romney received 55.1% of the vote (1,811 cast), ahead of Democrat Barack Obama with 43.5% (1,430 votes), and other candidates with 1.3% (44 votes), among the 3,302 ballots cast by the borough's 4,774 registered voters (17 ballots were spoiled), for a turnout of 69.2%. In the 2008 presidential election, Republican John McCain received 55.1% of the vote (1,968 cast), ahead of Democrat Barack Obama with 43.7% (1,561 votes) and other candidates with 0.9% (32 votes), among the 3,573 ballots cast by the borough's 4,759 registered voters, for a turnout of 75.1%. In the 2004 presidential election, Republican George W. Bush received 57.4% of the vote (1,986 ballots cast), outpolling Democrat John Kerry with 41.4% (1,430 votes) and other candidates with 0.5% (26 votes), among the 3,458 ballots cast by the borough's 4,822 registered voters, for a turnout percentage of 71.7.

In the 2013 gubernatorial election, Republican Chris Christie received 68.9% of the vote (1,320 cast), ahead of Democrat Barbara Buono with 29.8% (571 votes), and other candidates with 1.3% (25 votes), among the 1,949 ballots cast by the borough's 4,723 registered voters (33 ballots were spoiled), for a turnout of 41.3%. In the 2009 gubernatorial election, Republican Chris Christie received 56.9% of the vote (1,286 ballots cast), ahead of  Democrat Jon Corzine with 33.4% (755 votes), Independent Chris Daggett with 7.0% (159 votes) and other candidates with 1.5% (33 votes), among the 2,260 ballots cast by the borough's 4,615 registered voters, yielding a 49.0% turnout.

Education
The Butler Public Schools serves students in pre-kindergarten through twelfth grade. As of the 2021–22 school year, the district, comprised of three schools, had an enrollment of 1,156 students and 109.7 classroom teachers (on an FTE basis), for a student–teacher ratio of 10.5:1. Schools in the district (with 2021–22 enrollment data from the National Center for Education Statistics) are 
Aaron Decker School with 379 students in grades K-4, 
Richard Butler School with 299 students in grades 5-8 and 
Butler High School with 455 students in grades 9-12.

Students from Bloomingdale attend Butler High School as part of a sending/receiving relationship with the Bloomingdale School District.

St. Anthony of Padua School was a Catholic school operated under the auspices of the Roman Catholic Diocese of Paterson that was closed in June 2012 in the face of declining enrollment, after having served the community for 130 years.

Since March 2020, the Butler Public Schools have been shut due to the novel Coronavirus, or COVID-19. Students from grades 3–12 will be receiving lessons via Google Classroom, Pearson Education, Khan Academy and other sources. Students without home internet or those in grades Pre-K to 2 will be provided with traditional learning resources.

Transportation

Roads and highways

New Jersey Route 23 is the main highway serving Butler. County Route 511 also traverses the borough. Interstate 287 passes just outside the borough limits within neighboring municipalities.

Public transportation

NJ Transit bus service is provided on the 194 route to and from the Port Authority Bus Terminal in Midtown Manhattan, with seasonal service to Mountain Creek in Vernon Township on the 304 route.

Notable people

People who were born in, residents of, or otherwise closely associated with Butler include:

 Kurt Adler (1907–1977), music conductor
 Frederick Aldrich (1927–1991), marine biologist best known for his research on giant squid
 Benedict Lust (1872–1945), naturopathy pioneer who founded the Yungborn health resort
 Harry L. Sears (1920–2002), politician who served for 10 years in the New Jersey Legislature
 Andrew Turzilli (born 1991), wide receiver who played in the NFL for the Tennessee Titans
 Gary Wehrkamp (born 1970), musician, songwriter and producer best known a member of the progressive rock band Shadow Gallery

Points of interest
Founded in 1996, High Point Brewing Company is a brewer of German-style lagers and wheat beers.
 The Butler Museum is located on Main Street in the former NYS&W railroad station, across from 234 Main Street. The museum houses exhibits that reflects on the town's history.
 Meadtown Shopping Center is a shopping center located between Butler and Kinnelon that includes stores and restaurants and also includes a New York Sports Club, Stop & Shop, and Kinnelon Cinemas. It formerly housed a bowling alley.

References

External links

 Butler Borough website
 Butler Public Schools
 
 School Data for the Butler Public Schools, National Center for Education Statistics
 Daily Record – regional area newspaper

 
1901 establishments in New Jersey
Borough form of New Jersey government
Boroughs in Morris County, New Jersey
Populated places established in 1901